Ayr is a town in south-west Scotland in the county of Ayrshire.

Ayr may also refer to:

People
 Ayr (clan), a sub-clan of the Somali Hawiye clan
 Sheriff of Ayr (est. 1221) for Ayr, Scotland
 Ivan Ayr, film director
 Nicolás Ayr (born 1982) Argentine soccer player

Places

Australia 
 Ayr, Queensland, a town in Australia
 Shire of Ayr, a former local government area in Queensland, Australia, containing Ayr

Canada 
 Ayr, Ontario, a village in Canada
 Ayr Lake, a fjord on Baffin Island, Nunavut, Canada
 Ayr Pass, a mountain pass on Baffin Island, Nunavut, Canada

United Kingdom 
 Ayrshire, a county in Scotland, Chapman code AYR
 County of Ayr, Ayrshire, Scotland; containing Ayr
 Point of Ayr, the northernmost point of mainland Wales
 River Ayr, a river in Ayrshire, Scotland

United States 
 Ayr, Nebraska, a village in the U.S.
 Ayr, North Dakota, a village in the U.S.
 Ayr Township, Adams County, Nebraska, a township in the U.S.
 Ayr Township, Fulton County, Pennsylvania, a township in the U.S.

Elsewhere 
 Ayr (crater), on Mars
 Ayr, Iran, a village in Markazi Province, Iran
 Ayr Mountains, Kazakhstan
 Aïr Mountains, Niger

Government
 Ayr (Scottish Parliament constituency), a constituency of the Scottish Parliament (Holyrood)
 Ayr (UK Parliament constituency), a constituency of the House of Commons of the Parliament of the United Kingdom from 1950 to 2005
 Ayr and Renfrew (Commonwealth Parliament constituency), a constituency of the Kingdom of Scotland, and Commonwealth of Scotland and England; 1654-1659
 Sultanate of Agadez or Sultanate of Aïr

Schools

Australia 
Ayr State High School, Ayr, Queensland, Australia; a secondary school and heritage site

United Kingdom 
Ayr United Football Academy, Ayr, Ayrshire, Scotland, UK; a sports school
 Ayr College, Ayr, Ayrshire, Scotland, UK; a former college and now campus of Ayrshire College
 Ayr Academy, Ayr, Ayrshire, Scotland, UK; a secondary school

Sports
 Ayr Racecourse, Ayr, Ayrshire, Scotland, UK; a horse racing track
 Ayr RFC, Ayr, Ayrshire, Scotland, UK; a rugby union team
 Ayr United F.C., Ayr, Ayrshire, Scotland, UK; a soccer team
 Ayr F.C., Ayr, Ayrshire, Scotland, UK; a soccer team

Transportation

Australia 
 Ayr railway station, Queensland, Australia

United Kingdom 
 Ayr TMD, Ayr, Ayrshire, Scotland, UK; a rail depot
 Ayr railway station, Ayr, Ayrshire, Scotland, UK; current rail station
 Ayr railway station (1839–1857), Ayr, Ayrshire, Scotland, UK; former rail station
 Ayr railway station (1856-1886), Ayr, Ayrshire, Scotland, UK; a former rail station replaced by Ayr railway station
 English Electric Ayr, British 3-seat coastal patrol plane
 Point of Ayr Lighthouse, Point of Ayr, Wales, UK
 River Ayr Way, a long-distance path along the River Ayr, in Ayr, Ayrshire, Scotland, UK

Facilities and structures

Australia
 Ayr Court House, a heritage site in Ayr, Queensland
 Ayr Post Office, a heritage site in Ayr, Queensland

United Kingdom
 Ayr Castle, a castle
 Ayr Cathedral, a cathedral 
 Ayr Central, a shopping complex
 Ayr Pavilion, a music venue

United States
 Ayr Mount, a heritage plantation house in Hillsborough, North Carolina

Other
 2nd (Ayr) Ayrshire Artillery Volunteer Corps, of the British Army
 Alegrijes y Rebujos (AyR), a children's telenovela
 AYR, an Estonian manufacturer of sidecarcross frames
 Aymara language (ISO 639 code: ayr)

See also

 
 
 Ayr (constituency)
 Ayr County (disambiguation)
 Ayr Hospital (disambiguation)
 Ayr station (disambiguation)
 Ayr Township (disambiguation)
 Ayre (disambiguation)
 Ayres (disambiguation)
 Ayrshire (disambiguation)
 Heads of Ayr (disambiguation)
 Mount Ayr (disambiguation)
 Newton-on-Ayr (disambiguation)